Modern Jazz Trumpets is an album released by Prestige Records in 1951 with music by four jazz trumpeters: Fats Navarro, Dizzy Gillespie, Miles Davis and Kenny Dorham. The album was released on the 10" LP format and includes the first recordings by Davis for Prestige.

Cover art was a text layout similar to other early albums on Prestige. Later pressings used the same photo of Davis also used on his first three 10" LPs.

Track listing
A side
 Fats Navarro - Stop (Don Lanphere) – 4:03
 Fats Navarro - Go (Don Lanphere) – 4:03
 Fats Navarro - Wailing Wall (Don Lanphere) – 3:25	
 Dizzy Gillespie - Thinking of You  (Bert Kalmar, Harry Ruby) – 2:45

B side
 Miles Davis - Morpheus (John Lewis) – 2:21
 Miles Davis - Whispering (M. Schonberger, R. Coburn, V. Rose) – 3:03
 Miles Davis - Down (Miles Davis) – 2:51
 Dizzy Gillespie - Nice Work If You Can Get It (George Gershwin, Ira Gershwin) – 2:45
 Kenny Dorham - Maxology (Kenny Dorham) – 5:44

Personnel and recording dates
Maxology
 Kenny Dorham – trumpet
 James Moody – tenor saxophone
 Al Haig – piano
 Tommy Potter – bass
 Max Roach – drums 
Studio Technisonor, Paris, France, May 15, 1949

The Kenny Dorham track was also issued by Prestige on the following 78rpm single,  credited to James Moody:
 Prestige 702: James Moody - Maxology, Part 1&2

Stop, Go, Wailing Wall
 Fats Navarro – trumpet
 Don Lanphere – tenor saxophone
 Al Haig – piano
 Tommy Potter – bass
 Max Roach – drums 
NYC, September 20, 1949

The Fats Navarro tracks were also issued by Prestige on the following 78rpm singles:
 Prestige 812: Fats Navarro - Stop / Go 
 Prestige 819: Fats Navarro - Wailing Wall / Infatuation

Thinking of You, Nice Work If You Can Get It
 Dizzy Gillespie – trumpet
 Jimmy Heath – alto saxophone
 Jimmy Oliver – tenor saxophone
 Milt Jackson - piano
 Percy Heath – bass
 Joe Harris – drums 
NYC, September 16, 1950

The Dizzy Gillespie tracks were also issued by Prestige on the following 78rpm singles:
 Prestige 728: Sonny Stitt - To Think You've Chosen Me / Dizzy Gillespie - Thinking Of You
 Prestige 736: Dizzy Gillespie - She's Gone Again / Nice Work If You Can Get It

Morpheus, Whispering, Down
 Miles Davis – trumpet
 Bennie Green – trombone
 Sonny Rollins – tenor saxophone
 John Lewis – piano
 Percy Heath – bass
 Roy Haynes – drums
Apex Studios, New York City, January 17, 1951

Two takes of the tune "Blue Room" were also recorded at this session. 
This was Miles Davis' first recording session for Prestige Records, for whom he would record many albums over the next five years, as well as his first credited appearance as leader on an LP album. Davis had previously recorded one session under his own name, with Charlie Parker's band, for Savoy Records in 1947 (available on First Miles), and three sessions with his nonet for Capitol Records over 1949-1950 (Birth of the Cool).  It was also his first session with the young Sonny Rollins. After the session was completed, they would record one more track entitled "I Know" under Rollins' name, with Davis on piano. The Rollins track is available on the album Sonny Rollins with the Modern Jazz Quartet (PRLP 7029). Earlier in the same day, before his session at Prestige, Davis had also recorded a session as a sideman with Charlie Parker, for Verve Records, found on the Parker album Swedish Schnapps.

The Miles Davis tracks, including "Blue Room", were also released on two 78rpm singles. "Blue Room" would later be part of Davis' second 10"LP Blue Period (PRLP 140), and all four tracks would be re-released on the 12"LP Miles Davis and Horns (PRLP 7025), after the 10" format was discontinued. 
 Prestige 734: Miles Davis - Morpheus / Blue Room
 Prestige 742: Miles Davis - Down / Whispering

References

1951 albums
1951 compilation albums
Prestige Records compilation albums
Miles Davis albums
Dizzy Gillespie albums
Kenny Dorham albums
Prestige Records albums
Albums produced by Bob Weinstock